Sergio Alex Vargas Pino (born 24 July 1980) is a Chilean former footballer who played as a defensive midfielder.

External links
 
 

1980 births
Living people
People from San Antonio, Chile
Chilean footballers
O'Higgins F.C. footballers
Deportes Linares footballers
Deportes Temuco footballers
Cobreloa footballers
Everton de Viña del Mar footballers
Deportes La Serena footballers
Chilean Primera División players
Tercera División de Chile players
Primera B de Chile players
Association football midfielders